RagWing Aircraft Designs (also called the RagWing Aeroplane Company and RagWing Aviation) was an American aircraft design and manufacturing company based in Taylors, South Carolina.

The company was founded in 1987 and closed down in January 2000.

History
Roger Mann founded RagWing after he left the United States Air Force in 1987 as a multi-service aviation company providing flight instruction, maintenance, prototype design and flight testing of homebuilt aircraft. Mann's first aircraft design was marketed in 1991 and his range of products include 14 different fixed-wing aircraft designs. In the 1990s the company provided complete aircraft kits (less engines), but since the company closed in January 2000 this has been reduced to providing plans only and builder support. Mann stated in 2012 that, "plans are still available but are mainly sold for their historical value".

The company's products are predominantly designs for aircraft of glued wooden construction, covered in aircraft fabric, hence the name of the company.

Aircraft

References

External links
Archives of the official website on Archive.org
Roger Mann's Official website
Roger Mann's Facebook page

Defunct aircraft manufacturers of the United States